Flavius Mareka FET College is situated in the Fezile Dabi District of the Free State Province, South Africa. The Flavius Mareka FET College includes the following former institutions:  Kroonstad - Mphohadi - and Sasolburg Campus.

External links

Higher education in South Africa